The orienteering competition at the 2017 World Games took place from July 25 to July 27, in Wrocław in Poland, at the Centennial Hall, City Center and Trzebnica Aquapark.

Participating nations

Medal table

Events

Men's events

Women's events

Mixed event

References

External links
 The World Games 2017
 Result Book

Orienteering at the 2017 World Games
Orienteering at the World Games
2017 World Games